Anne Elisabet Jensen (born 17 August 1951, in Kalundborg) is a Danish politician who served as a Member of the European Parliament from 1999 until 2014. She is a member of the Venstre, part of the Alliance of Liberals and Democrats for Europe.

In parliament, Jensen served on the European Parliament's Committee on Budgets. She was also a substitute for the Committee on Employment and Social Affairs and the Committee on Transport and Tourism.

Education
 1978: Master's degree in political and economic science from University of Copenhagen
 Economist (1978–1984) at Privatbanken
 Chief economist (1985–1994) at Privatbanken/Unibank
 Journalist (1984–1985) and senior editor (1996–1998), Berlingske Tidende

Career
 1994-1996: Director of the Danish Employers' Confederation
 1999-2014: Member of the European Parliament
 2002-2004: Vice-chairwoman of the Committee on Budgets

See also
 2004 European Parliament election in Denmark

External links
 
 
 

1951 births
Living people
University of Copenhagen alumni
MEPs for Denmark 1999–2004
MEPs for Denmark 2004–2009
MEPs for Denmark 2009–2014
20th-century women MEPs for Denmark
21st-century women MEPs for Denmark
People from Kalundborg
Venstre (Denmark) MEPs